Black Lake is a lake in the Hudson Bay drainage basin in the Unorganized Part of Kenora District in Northwestern Ontario, Canada. The primary outflow is an unnamed creek north to Botsford Lake on the Marchington River, which flows via the English River, the Winnipeg River and the Nelson River to Hudson Bay. The CN transcontinental rail line crosses the creek between Black Lake and Botsford Lake.

See also
List of lakes in Ontario

References

Other map sources:

Lakes of Kenora District